Adam Gregg (born April 26, 1983) is an American lawyer and politician serving as the 47th lieutenant governor of Iowa. He has held this position since 2019. Gregg previously served as Acting Lieutenant Governor from 2017 to 2019. A member of the Republican Party, Gregg served as Public Defender of Iowa from 2014 to 2017. He was the Republican candidate for Attorney General of Iowa in the November 2014 elections.

Early life, education, and family
Gregg was born in Hawarden, Iowa.

In 2006, Gregg graduated from Central College with a B.A. in political science and history. From 2006 to 2009, he attended Drake University Law School on a full scholarship and graduated with high honors. While there, he earned the faculty's William and Ellen Cooney Hoye Award and was a junior staff member of the Drake Law Review.

Career
During his time at Central College, Gregg interned with the United States Department of Defense, United States Congress, and Parliament of the United Kingdom. While attending Drake University Law School, he conducted legal research for Iowa Supreme Court Chief Justice Mark Cady.

Gregg was the Republican nominee for Attorney General of Iowa in 2014. He lost to the long-time incumbent attorney general, Democrat Tom Miller.

Gregg was appointed by Governor Terry Branstad to serve as the Iowa State Public Defender on December 8, 2014.

Acting Lieutenant Governor of Iowa (2017–2019) 
As the previous Lieutenant Governor of Iowa, Kim Reynolds assumed Iowa's governorship when incumbent Governor Terry Branstad resigned to become United States Ambassador to China. Due to ambiguities in Iowa's constitution and a controversial advisory opinion issued by Attorney General Tom Miller, there was some dispute regarding Reynolds' power to appoint a new lieutenant governor with the power to succeed her if she left office prior to the expiration of Branstad's unfilled term. To avoid the possibility of legal challenges, Reynolds appointed Gregg as acting Lieutenant Governor of Iowa on May 25, 2017. Gregg was assigned all of the duties of Lieutenant Governor, but not the office itself, and so was not in the line of gubernatorial succession. Upon his appointment, it was reported that Gregg would be paid the salary set by Iowa law for the lieutenant governor position ($103,212).

Lieutenant Governor of Iowa (2019–present)
Gregg was sworn in as the 47th lieutenant governor of Iowa on January 18, 2019.

Personal life 
Gregg married his West Sioux High School sweetheart, Cari. They have two children, Jackson and Lauren.

Electoral history

See also

 List of lieutenant governors of Iowa

References

|-

|-

|-

1983 births
21st-century American politicians
Central College (Iowa) alumni
Iowa Republicans
Lieutenant Governors of Iowa
Living people
People from Hawarden, Iowa
People from Johnston, Iowa
Drake University Law School alumni
Public defenders